Fazlollah Zahedi (pronounced ; 17 May 1892 – 2 September 1963) was an Iranian lieutenant general and statesman who replaced the Iranian Prime Minister Mohammad Mosaddegh through a coup d'état supported by the United States and the United Kingdom.

Early life

Early years
Born in Hamedan on 17 May 1892, Fazlollah Zahedi was the son of Abol Hassan "Bassir Diwan" Zahedi, a wealthy landowner at the city of Hamedan. He was a descendant of the Sufi mystics Sheikh Zahed Gilani and Sheikh Safi-ad-din Ardabili, the eponym of the Safavid dynasty, and through his mother, Djavaher Khanom, he traced his descent to the dynastic ruler Karim Khan Zand. Through him, Zahedi was a distant relative of Mohammad Mossadegh.

During his service at the Imperial Russian-trained Iranian Cossack Brigade, one of his military superiors was Reza Khan, who later became the Iranian monarch. Zahedi was among the officers dispatched to Gilan to put an end to the Jangal movement of Mirza Kuchak Khan. At the age of 23, as a company commander, Zahedi led troops into battle against rebel tribesmen in the northern provinces. Two years later Reza Shah promoted him to the rank of brigadier general. He was involved in the overthrow of Seyyed Zia'eddin Tabatabaee's government in 1920 with the help of Meguertitch Khan Davidkhanian.

During Reza Shah's reign, General Zahedi was named military governor of Khuzestan province in 1926, his first important government position, and in 1932 chief of national police, one of the nation's top internal posts. In 1941 he was appointed commanding general of the Isfahan division.

Arrest and internment
Following the forced abdication of Reza Shah in 1941, the British came to believe that Zahedi was planning a general uprising in cooperation with German forces, and as one of the worst grain-hoarders, was responsible for widespread popular discontent. He was arrested in his own office by Fitzroy Maclean, who details the adventure in his 1949 memoir Eastern Approaches. On searching Zahidi's bedroom Maclean found "a collection of automatic weapons of German manufacture, a good deal of silk underwear, some opium, an illustrated register of the prostitutes of Isfahan," and correspondence from a local German agent. Zahedi was flown out of the country and interned in Palestine.

Return from internment
After returning from internment in 1945 during the reign of Mohammad Reza Shah (Reza Shah's son and successor), General Zahedi became Inspector of military forces in southern Iran. He became once more chief of national police (Shahrbani) in 1949, when Mohammad Reza Shah appointed him as chief of the Shahrbani Police Forces, in order to counter the growing threat of Sepahbod Haj Ali Razmara.

After 1945

The 1950s
After retiring from the army, he was named Senator in 1950. Zahedi was appointed minister of interior in Hossein Ala''s administration in 1951, a post he would retain when Mohammad Mossadegh became prime minister. Zahedi actively supported the new government's nationalisation of the oil industry, which had previously been owned by the Anglo-Iranian Oil Company, now BP. However, he was at odds with Mossadegh over his increasing tolerance for the outlawed communist party Tudeh, which had boldly demonstrated in favor of nationalisation. Both of these moves antagonised the Western Powers, especially the United Kingdom and the United States. Zahedi was dismissed by Prime Minister Mossadegh after a bloody crackdown on pro-nationalization protesters in mid-1951 in which 20 people were killed and 2000 wounded.

Zahedi finally broke with Mossadegh, with the latter accusing him of fostering plans for a coup. Meanwhile, sanctions levied by the Western Powers significantly curtailed Iranian oil exports, leading to an economic crisis. Disorder among several ethnic groups in southern Iran and labor unrest among oil-field workers put further pressures on the government.

1953 coup

At the behest of the British and American governments, the Iranian military carried out a coup d'état which put an end to Mossadeq's rule and the era of constitutional monarchy and replaced it by direct rule of the Shah. The newly formed CIA, along with the British intelligence agency MI6, took an active role in the developments, terming their involvement Operation Ajax. Zahedi and his followers, financed by the foreign intelligence services, planted newspaper articles in Iranian publications and paid agent provocateurs to start riots. There were such riots in Tehran and other cities. Fearing his arrest, Zahedi went into hiding.

On 15 August, after the first attempted coup d'état failed, the Shah fled first to Baghdad, Iraq, and then to Rome, Italy, after signing two decrees, one dismissing Mossadegh and the other naming Zahedi to replace him as Prime Minister. Both decrees were in accordance with clause 46 of the Iranian constitution, which stated that the Shah had the power to appoint all Ministers.

Backed by the United Kingdom and the United States, and encouraged by the intelligence agents Kermit Roosevelt Jr and Donald Wilber, Zahedi staged a second coup on 19 August 1953. Military units arrested Mossadeq at his home at night. The Shah returned from exile on 22 August 1953. According to the CIA, Zahedi was chosen because he was acceptable to the United States and Britain, had a long record of opposing Mossadeq, had a significant following, and was willing to take the job.

Premiership and later years
General Zahedi was appointed prime minister in August 1953, and his cabinet was declared on 20 August. One-thirds of the ministers in Zahedi's cabinet were army officers. His tenure as prime minister ended in April 1955, and he was replaced by Hussein Ala.

His final post was Ambassador to the United Nations, in Geneva, where he died in 1963.

Personal life

Zahedi married Khadijeh Pirnia tol-Moluk, daughter of Hossein Pirnia (titled Mo'tamen al Molk), and maternal granddaughter to Mozaffar ad-Din Shah Qajar. They had a son, Ardeshir, and a daughter, Homa.

Ardeshir was a politician and diplomat and married Princess Shahnaz Pahlavi, the daughter of Mohammad Reza Pahlavi from his first marriage to Princess Fawzia of Egypt, daughter of King Fuad I.

His daughter Homa Zahedi was a member of Parliament, representing the constituency of the Hamadan Province.

According to The New York Times report a day after the 1953 coup, "General Zahedi married twice, but it is not known here whether his second wife is living. By his second wife he had two sons, one of whom lives in Sydney, Australia, while the second son, an air force officer, was killed in a crash."

See also
 Anglo-Soviet invasion of Iran
List of prime ministers of Iran
Monarchism in Iran

References

Citations

Bibliography
 'Alí Rizā Awsatí (عليرضا اوسطى), Iran in the past three centuries (Irān dar Se Qarn-e Goz̲ashteh - ايران در سه قرن گذشته), Volumes 1 and 2 (Paktāb Publishing - انتشارات پاکتاب, Tehran, Iran, 2003).  (Vol. 1),  (Vol. 2).

External links

 Secrets of History: The C.I.A. in Iran -- A special report.; How a Plot Convulsed Iran in '53 (and in '79). The New York Times, 16 April 2000.
 The New York Times article of 20 August 1953
 The Washington Post article of 18 August 2010
 The Washington Times article of 16 August 2010

20th-century Iranian politicians
1892 births
1963 deaths
Foreign ministers of Iran
Interior Ministers of Iran
Grand Crosses 1st class of the Order of Merit of the Federal Republic of Germany
Imperial Iranian Army lieutenant generals
Iranian anti-communists
Iranian collaborators with Nazi Germany
Leaders who took power by coup
People from Hamadan
People of Pahlavi Iran
Prime Ministers of Iran